Coturnicini is a tribe of birds in the subfamily Phasianinae. It contains the Old World quail, snowcocks, and African spurfowl, among others. Members of this tribe have a wide range throughout Africa, Eurasia, and Australasia. This tribe contains the only members of Pavoninae native to continental Europe (Coturnix and Alectoris), as well as the only members of Phasianidae as a whole native to Australasia (Coturnix and Synoicus). This grouping was supported by a 2021 phylogenetic analysis of Galliformes, and has been accepted by the International Ornithological Congress. The tribe name is accepted by the Howard and Moore Complete Checklist of the Birds of the World.

Species

References 

Bird tribes
Coturnicini